The History of Human Marriage is an 1891 book by the Finnish philosopher and anthropologist Edvard Westermarck that provides an overview of marriage over time. 

The Finnish philosopher Jaakko Hintikka calls the work a monumental study and a classic in its field, but notes that it is now antiquated.

Summary

In the book, Westermarck defined marriage as "a more or less durable connection between male and female lasting beyond the mere act of propagation till after the birth of the offspring." 

Westermarck argues that marriage is a social institution that rests on a biological foundation, and developed through a process in which human males came to live together with human females for sexual gratification, companionship, mutual economic aid, procreation, and the joint rearing of offspring.

Besides other observations and propositions, Westermarck also proposes that people who live in close domestic proximity during the first few years of their lives become desensitized to sexual attraction, and as one explanation for the incest taboo. This hypothesis has come to be known as the Westermarck effect, named after him, or as reverse sexual imprinting.

Scholarly reception
David Blankenhorn calls the book one of the best histories of human marriage, and considers it deservedly famous. He comments, however, that it leaves out a great deal of material while "skimming too quickly over too much." Blankenhorn believes, however, that scholarship subsequent to Westermarck's has tended to support his conclusions.

Bertrand Russell extensively used citations from the book in Marriage and Morals.

References

Bibliography

External links 
 The History of Human Marriage. Volume I, 5th edition (1921)
 The History of Human Marriage. Volume II, 5th edition (1921)
 The History of Human Marriage. Volume III, 5th edition (1921)

1891 non-fiction books
Books by Edvard Westermarck
Books about marriage
Sociology books